Shin Seok-cho (1909-1975) was a Korean poet and journalist. He was born in Seocheon, Chungcheongnam-do, in 1909. Involved with socialism, he joined  (KAPF) but subsequently withdrew. In 1935, he met Yi Yuk-sa and became a close acquaintance. 

He published poems such as "Bara dance", "Snakes", and "Pacho". He also served as the president of the Society of Korean Poets, and worked as a writer for the Hankook Ilbo.

Works list
"Bara dance"  
"The song of the storm"
"Cheo-yong says"

See also
Society of Korean Poets
Seocheon County

References

External links 
  

Korean male poets
Literature of Korea under Japanese rule
1909 births
1975 deaths
20th-century Korean poets
20th-century male writers